Ling Cong is a former Chinese professional footballer who played as a midfielder.

Club career

Happy Valley
In the 2008–09 season, Lin Cong scored 15 goals for Happy Valley and was the club's top scorer.

On 5 May 2010, Ling Cong was questioned by the Independent Commission Against Corruption over match fixing. He missed the club's training but team official said he pulled a muscle. On 7 May, Ling Cong said he was questioned for information but he was not arrested and he had nothing to do with the case. It was a mistake for the media to report that he was arrested and he worried about his future in Hong Kong football.

Sun Hei
Ling Cong joined Sun Hei for the 2010–11 Hong Kong First Division League.

Tuen Mun
Ling Cong joined Tuen Mun for the 2011–12 Hong Kong First Division League season. On 23 October 2011, Lin Cong scored a hat-trick and helped Tuen Mun beat Sham Shui Po 6:2.

On 30 October 2012, due to the divestment of Tuen Mun president Chan Keung, various key players, including Ling Cong, and the whole coaching team were released by the club.

References

External links
 Ling Cong at HKFA

1983 births
Living people
Footballers from Shenyang
Association football midfielders
Chinese footballers
Chinese expatriate footballers
Expatriate footballers in Hong Kong
Changsha Ginde players
Hong Kong First Division League players
Sun Hei SC players
Happy Valley AA players